3-Hexanol (IUPAC name: hexan-3-ol; also called ethyl propyl carbinol) is an organic chemical compound. It occurs naturally in the flavor and aroma of plants such as pineapple and is used as a food additive to add flavor.

Reactions 
3-Hexanol can be synthesized by the hydroboration of unsaturated hexane compounds such as 3-hexyne.

References 

Secondary alcohols
Flavors
Hexanols